ASCJ may stand for:

 Amalgamated Society of Carpenters and Joiners, former British trade union
 Apostles of the Sacred Heart of Jesus, Catholic women's religious organisation